This is a list of Wichita State Shockers baseball seasons. The Wichita State Shockers baseball program is the college baseball team that represents Wichita State University in the American Athletic Conference in the National Collegiate Athletic Association. Wichita State plays their home games at Eck Stadium in Wichita, Kansas.

Wichita State has won one national championship and appeared in seven College World Series.

Season results

Notes

Sources:

References

 
Wichita State
Wichita State Shockers baseball seasons